Sunseri is a surname. Notable people with the surname include:

John Sunseri (born 1969), American writer
Rodolfo Padilla Sunseri, Honduran politician
Sal Sunseri (born 1959), American football coach
Tino Sunseri (born 1988), Canadian football player
Vinnie Sunseri (born 1991), American football player

Italian-language surnames